Douglas L. Anderton is an American sociologist and statistician. He is a Fellow of the American Association for Advancement of Science and the American Statistical Association, and an elected member of the Sociological Research Association and International Statistical Institute. He earned an B.S. in economics (1973), an M.S. in economics (1975), and a Ph.D. in sociology (1983), all from the University of Utah. At the University of Utah He worked on the human genetics research project with Dr. Lee L. Bean and Dr. Mark Skolnick, among others. He taught at the University of Chicago from 1983-1986, where he worked with Dr. Donald Bogue as an Associate Director of the Social Development Center. Then, he moved to the University of Massachusetts-Amherst where he taught from 1988 to 2012, serving first as Peter H. Rossi's Associate Director, as long time Director, of the Social and Demographic Research Institute, and as the College of Behavioral Sciences Associate Dean for Research. He taught at the University of South Carolina and served as Chair of the Department of Sociology from 2012-2020 and as an Associate Dean in 2020.

A major portion of his research has focused on historical demography and population health. His early work focused on the fertility transition in the Mormon population in collaboration with Lee L. Bean and Geraldine Mineau, among others.  His historical work has included several international populations and more recently has focused upon mortality in the Connecticut River Valley of Massachusetts.  His contemporary research focus grows from his extensive work on environmental justice and environmental health issues in the United States and has most recently involved the field of social epigenetics. He and his colleague Dr. Kathleen Arcaro at UMass-Amherst, who is responsible for the breast milk project, are studying both the biochemical make-up of breast milk and epigenetic damage to breast cells, using bio-assays from a large population of nursing women along with their social history.

His work has been funded by the National Science Foundation, the National Institutes of Health, the Department of Defense, the Environmental Protection Agency and the AVON Foundation, among other sources.  He is the co-author of several books including Adaptation and Innovation: Fertility on the Frontier (1990, with Lee L. Bean and Geraldine P. Mineau), The Population of the United States (1997, with Richard Barrett and Donald Bogue), Readings in Population Methodology (1993, with Donald Bogue and Eduardo Arriaga co-editors), Demography: The Study of Human Population (2001, with David Yaukey and 2007 with David Yaukey and Jennifer Lundquist) and Public Sociology: Michael Buroway and his critics (2006, with Dan Clawson, Robert Zussman, Michael Buroway, Joya Misra, Naomi Gerstel and Randall Stokes).  His most cited research articles include Hazardous Waste Facilities: " Environmental Equity" Issues in Metropolitan Areas (1994), A longitudinal analysis of environmental equity in communities with hazardous waste facilities (1996), Sexual harassment: Organizational context and diffuse status (1987), Intergenerational transmission of relative fertility and life course patterns (1987), Birth spacing and fertility limitation: A behavioral analysis of a nineteenth century frontier population (1985), Demographics of dumping II: A national environmental equity survey and the distribution of hazardous materials handlers (2000), Grammars of death: An analysis of nineteenth-century literal causes of death from the age of miasmas to germ theory (2004), and Determination of free Bisphenol A (BPA) concentrations in breast milk of US women using a sensitive LC/MS/MS method (2014).  He has published over 65 refereed research articles including those noted.

References

Year of birth missing (living people)
Living people
University of South Carolina faculty
American sociologists
Fellows of the American Association for the Advancement of Science
Fellows of the American Statistical Association